Steven Eugene Shreve is a mathematician and currently the Orion Hoch Professor of Mathematical Sciences at Carnegie Mellon University and the author of several major books on the mathematics of financial derivatives.

His first degree, awarded in 1972 was in German from West Virginia University. He then studied mathematics at Georg-August-Universität Göttingen. He then took a Masters in Electrical Engineering at the University of Illinois, where he completed a PhD in mathematics in 1977.

His textbook Stochastic Calculus for Finance is used by numerous graduate programs in quantitative finance. The book was voted "Best New Book in Quantitative Finance" in 2004 by members of Wilmott website, and has been highly praised by scholars in the field.
Shreve is a Fellow of the Institute of Mathematical Statistics.

Since 2006, he has held the Orion Hoch Chair Of Mathematical Sciences at CMU.

Books
Stochastic Optimal Control: The Discrete Time Case with Dimitri P. Bertsekas, Academic Press, 1978.
Brownian Motion and Stochastic Calculus with Ioannis Karatzas Springer-Verlag, 2nd Ed. 1991.
Methods of Mathematical Finance with Ioannis Karatzas Springer-Verlag, 1998
Stochastic Calculus for Finance. Volume I: The Binomial Asset Pricing ModelVolume II: Continuous-Time Models'' Springer-Verlag, 2004

The most recent volume was awarded "New Book of the Year" by Wilmott magazine.

References

External links
Shreve's Home Page

20th-century births
Living people
20th-century American mathematicians
21st-century American mathematicians
University of Illinois alumni
West Virginia University alumni
Carnegie Mellon University faculty
Financial economists
Mathematical analysts
Probability theorists
Fellows of the Institute of Mathematical Statistics
Year of birth missing (living people)
Place of birth missing (living people)